Ottignies-Louvain-la-Neuve is a city and municipality of Wallonia located in the Belgian province of Walloon Brabant. On January 1, 2006, Ottignies-Louvain-la-Neuve had a total population of 29,521. The total area is 32.96 km² which gives a population density of 896 inhabitants per km².

The municipality consists of the following sub-municipalities: Ottignies, Louvain-la-Neuve, Céroux-Mousty, and Limelette. Louvain-la-Neuve (sometimes abbreviated as "LLN") is a new town developed from 1968 in order to provide a home for the University of Louvain (UCLouvain), the French-speaking part of the former Catholic University of Louvain on its separation from the Dutch-speaking part, which remained in the ancient city of Louvain (Leuven).

Louvain-la-Neuve Science Park

Created in 1971, Louvain-la-Neuve Science Park is the first of its kind in Belgium and is the biggest one in Wallonia (the French-speaking part of Belgium). It covers  spread over the area of the town of Ottignies-Louvain-la-Neuve and the municipality of Mont-Saint-Guibert ( away from Brussels).

Sports

Ottignies-Louvain-la-Neuve is home to the Royal Ottignies Stimont football club (soccer) and the Rugby Ottignies Club (rugby).

References

External links
 
 Municipality Website
 The Louvain-la-Neuve Science Park website
 Louvain-la-Neuve WebTV
 Facebook group for residents of Ottignies-Louvain-la-Neuve
 

 
Cities in Wallonia
Municipalities of Walloon Brabant